The World Yo-Yo Contest is the culminating yo-yo competition of the worldwide competitive circuit and is considered the most prestigious yo-yo competition in the world. The winner of this competition in any of the six championship divisions is deemed the World Yo-Yo Champion; the World Yo-Yo Contest is the only event to award such a title. The contest attracts competitors from all over the world and an increasingly large number of spectators. The annual competition is currently run by the International Yo-Yo Federation (IYYF) and the national organization of each year's host nation. As of 2015, 33 countries have sent competitors to the World Yo-Yo Contest from their respective national yo-yo contests. World Yo-Yo Contest is also known as YoYoCon.

History
The first World Yo-Yo Contest was held in London, England, in 1932. The winner was Harvey Lowe. However, the contest was not held annually until 1992, when Dale Oliver started one in Montreal, Canada during that year's annual International Jugglers' Association's (IJA) convention. The contest was held during this convention until 1999, when it was held in Hawaii. The 2000 contest was held at Universal Studios in Orlando, but in 2001, the event moved to the Rosen Plaza Hotel, where it was held annually until 2013 by Gregory Cohen, owner and operator of YoYoGuy and Infinite Illusions. After the 2013 contest, an international coalition (the IYYF) was formed to organize a new, rotating contest which will be held in a different venue/country every year.

Location
Following the creation of the IYYF in 2013, The World Yo-Yo Contest now cycles between America, Europe, and Asia. This cycling is scheduled through 2018. The bidding process involves the IYYF and the interested National Organization. After finals of the 2016 WYYC on day 4, Steve Brown announced a bid for the 2018 WYYC in Shanghai, China.

 2014 Europe (Prague, Czech Republic)
 2015 Asia (Tokyo, Japan)
 2016 United States of America (Cleveland, Ohio)
 2017 Europe (Reykjavik, Iceland)
 2018 Asia (Shanghai, China)
 2019 United States of America (Cleveland, Ohio)
 2023 Asia (Tokyo, Japan)

Online World Yo-Yo Contest 
Prior to the COVID-19 pandemic, the 2020 World Yo-Yo Contest was slated to be held in Budapest, Hungary. The pandemic, however, caused organizers to cancel the 2020 competition. In 2021 and 2022, to mitigate the possibility of attendees getting sick, the Online World Yo-Yo Contest was created, giving prospective World Yo-Yo Contest competitors the opportunity to compete in an online setting. The results of the 2021 online competition are given below.

There was also an artistic performance division (AP), in which two awards were given. The Entertainment Award went to YOYOBOYS (Robert Kučera & Zdenek Hybl) and the Artistic Award went to Naoto Okada.

The winners of the Online World Yo-Yo Contest do not gain the title of World Yo-Yo Champion, however. The title they receive is that of Online World Yo-Yo Champion (in their respective divisions).

Current champions
As mentioned above, the World Yo-Yo Contest did not take place in 2020, 2021, or 2022. In 2021 and 2022, the Online World Yo-Yo Contest was held in its place, the champions thereof receiving the title of Online World Yo-Yo Champion (as opposed to World Yo-Yo Champion). Thus, the current World Yo-Yo Champions are those who won in 2019, when the competition was held in Cleveland, Ohio. The results of said competition are given below. 

List of past World Yo-Yo Champions

Winners by country and players

The World Yo-Yo Contest has historically been dominated by the Japanese-taking home 85 World Titles in the past 22 years. The United States has also had a lesser dominance, taking home 27 World Titles.

Shinji Saito remains the most decorated yo-yoer of all-time with 13 World Titles. Takeshi Matsuura, Hajima Miura and Rei Iwakura are tied for second with each at 7.

Historical notes 
In 2003, Brazil's Rafael Matsunaga became the first player outside Japan or the United States to win a World Title, doing so in 5A (Counterweight). In 2004, Hiroyuki Suzuki won his first World Title. Both Daisuke Shimada and Shinji Saito won their third World Title in as many years. Hiroyuki Suzuki became the first player to ever win back-to-back titles in the 1A division in 2005. Shinji Saito continued his dominance, winning his fourth World Title in the 2A division. Kentaro Kimura won the 3A division with what is considered the greatest 3A routine of all time in 2009. In 2010, Canada's Jensen Kimmitt became the first player outside Japan or the United States to win a World Title in 1A. Without Shinji Saito entering the 2A division, Yashushi Furakawa won the World Title. Singapore's Marcus Koh became the second player outside of the United States or Japan to win in the 1A division. Shinji Saito also returned from a year competition hiatus to win the 2A division for a record eighth time. In 2012, Switzerland's inmot!on became the first team outside Japan or the United States to win the Artistic Performance (AP) division. It was also the first ever World Title won by European competitors. In 2013, Hungary's Janos Karancz became the first European to win the 1A division at the World Yo-Yo Contest. 2013 was also the first, and only, year to feature a top-3 in 1A with no players from Japan or the United States. In 2014, Rei Iwakura completed a flawless routine in the 4A division en route to his third World Title.

Championship divisions
The World Yo-Yo Contest has 6 championship divisions that award the title of 'World Yo-Yo Champion'

Championship division structure
There are a series of preliminary rounds before the final round at the World Yo-Yo Contest. In the past, anyone could enter the World Yo-Yo Contest. Competitors were allowed a one-minute routine, and a set number of players would make the finals. The preliminary rounds have been evolving over the years to accommodate the growing popularity of competitive yo-yos around the world.

In the 1A division, there are currently four rounds of competition. In 2A-5A, there is currently only the Preliminary (1 minute) and the Final (3 minute).
 Wild-Card (30 seconds)
 Any player can enter the Wild-Card round
 Preliminary (1 minute)
 Top-10 at a sanctioned National Competition/Multi-National Competition seeded directly to Preliminary
 Top performing competitors from Wild-Card
 Semi-Final (1:30 minutes)
 Top-3 at sanctioned Multi-National Competition & sanctioned National Champions seeded directly to Semi-Final
 Top performing competitors from Preliminary
 Final (3 minutes)
 Previous Year's World Champion seeded directly to Final

Sanctioned seeding competitions
Players can earn a seed to various rounds of the preliminaries through multi-national competitions, national competitions, and the previous year's World Yo-Yo Contest.
 European Yo-Yo Championship (Kraków, Poland)
 Las Vegas Yo-Yo Championship (Las Vegas, United States)
 Asia Pacific Yo-Yo Championship (Singapore, Singapore)
 Latin American Yo-Yo Championship (Mexico City, Mexico)
 Previous year's World Yo-Yo Contest (Prague, Czech Republic)
 One of 33 IYYF approved National Competitions

Defunct divisions
The World Yo-Yo Contest has also held other championship divisions that are now defunct either because it was replaced or had judging standardization issues.

Non-championship divisions
In addition to these World Divisions, the World Yo-Yo Contest also hosts additional divisions such as the 'Women's Division' and, in 2015, the 'Over 40 Freestyle'. There is also numerous yo-yo modifying and design contests, known in the field as modding. These non-championships divisions do not award the title of 'World Yo-Yo Champion'.

Participating nations
There are 33 countries currently registered with the IYYF that have the right to seed a National Champion into the semi-final round at the World Yo-Yo Contest. IYYF is also in communication with several other countries (denoted by *), but, currently, these countries do not have the right to seed a National Champion to the semi-finals.

Europe

 *
 *
 *
 *
 *
 *

North America

Asia/Oceania

 *
 *
 *
 *
 *

Africa
 *
 *

South America

 *
 *
 *

References

External links 
 World Yo-Yo Contest The World Yo-Yo Contest Web Site
International Yo-Yo Federation IYYF (International Yo-Yo Federation) Web site
NYYL (National Yo-Yo League)  The National Yo-Yo League Web site

Yo-yo competitions